"Unconditional Love" is a song performed by American contemporary R&B group Hi-Five. It initially appeared on the soundtrack to the film Menace II Society and was later included as the closing track on the group's third studio album Faithful. The song peaked at #92 on the Billboard Hot 100 in 1993.

Music video
The official music video for the song was directed by Marcus Nispel.

Chart positions

References

External links
 
 

1993 songs
1993 singles
Hi-Five songs
Jive Records singles
Music videos directed by Marcus Nispel